Baron Bateman, of Shobdon in the County of Hereford, was a title in the Peerage of the United Kingdom. It was created on 30 January 1837 for William Bateman, previously member of Parliament for Northampton. Born William Hanbury, he was the grandson of William Hanbury and Sarah, daughter of William Western and Anne, sister of William Bateman, 1st Viscount Bateman (a title which became extinct in 1802). Lord Bateman was succeeded by his eldest son, the second Baron. He held minor political office and served as Lord-Lieutenant of Herefordshire for many years. The title became extinct on the death of his childless son, the third Baron, in 1931.

Charles Bateman-Hanbury-Kincaid-Lennox, younger son of the first Baron, was a politician.

Barons Bateman (1837)
William Hanbury Bateman, 1st Baron Bateman (1780–1845)
William Bateman Bateman-Hanbury, 2nd Baron Bateman (1826–1901)
William Spencer Bateman-Hanbury, 3rd Baron Bateman (1856–1931)

Arms

See also
Viscount Bateman

References

Extinct baronies in the Peerage of the United Kingdom
1837 establishments in the United Kingdom
Noble titles created in 1837
Noble titles created for UK MPs